Two Japanese destroyers have borne the name Samidare:

  was a  launched in 1935 and sunk  in 1944.
  is a  launched in 1998.

Japanese Navy ship names